The Sweden women's national field hockey team represents Sweden in women's international field hockey competitions.

Tournament history

EuroHockey Championship
1995 – 12th place

See also
Sweden men's national field hockey team

References

European women's national field hockey teams
Field hockey
National team